Thierry Manzi (born 12 July 1996) is a Rwandan footballer who plays for Dila Gori and Rwanda national football team.

References

1996 births
Living people
Rwandan footballers
Rwanda international footballers
Isonga F.C. players
Rayon Sports F.C. players
Association football defenders
FC Dila Gori players
Erovnuli Liga players
Expatriate footballers in Georgia (country)
People from Kigali
2018 African Nations Championship players
Rwanda A' international footballers
Rwandan expatriate sportspeople in Georgia (country)
Rwandan expatriate footballers
2020 African Nations Championship players